Anita Natacha Akide a.k.a. Symply Tacha is  media personality, Entrepreneur, and philanthropist. She has appeared on the show Big Brother Naija (season 4) as a housemate and also on MTV's The Challenge: Spies, Lies & Allies. She has won the awards like Net Honour's Most Popular Person, Female Personality of The Year, Celebrity Entrepreneur of the year and many more. She was the brand ambassador of GetFit, a Fitness brand

Early life and education
In 2016, Akide received a Bachelor of Arts in English Language from the Ignatius Ajuru University of Education

Career 
Akide joined the reality show Big Brother Naija (season 4) and also appeared in the reality show  MTV's The Challenge: Spies, Lies & Allies. She acts as a brand ambassador for the eyewear company House of Lunettes, 
RealTech Company OxfordBuildBay, a representative for the fitness brand GetFit, and the global alcoholic beverage company Ciroc. She also  debuted her Tacha Fierce brand of limited-edition Ciroc beverages.

Television

Films

Philanthropy

Natacha Akide Foundation (NAF) 
Tacha founded Natacha Akide Foundation (NAF) in 2020 with the motive to serve the underprivileged. She started the initiative, Pad For Every Girl (PEG) to educate every girl of female hygiene.

Action Against Hunger 
She started this initiative to fight the hunger problem amongst the families which suffered during the pandemic.

PVC Awareness Campaign 
She went to River state in 2022 to encourage her people to get their Permanent Voter's Card (PVC) against 2023 election.

Awards

References

Nigerian media personalities
21st-century Nigerian actresses
21st-century Nigerian businesswomen
21st-century Nigerian businesspeople
Nigerian philanthropists
Actresses from Rivers State
Participants in Nigerian reality television series
Big Brother (franchise) contestants
Living people
Year of birth missing (living people)